PP-161 Lahore-XVIII is a Constituency of Provincial Assembly of Punjab.

General elections 2013

General elections 2018

See also
 PP-160 Lahore-XVII
 PP-162 Lahore-XIX

References

External links
 Election commission Pakistan's official website
 Awazoday.com check result
 Official Website of Government of Punjab

Constituencies of Punjab, Pakistan